The Robert B. Miller College was a private college in Battle Creek, Michigan. It was housed in the Mawby Center of Kellogg Community College and closed in 2016.

Liberal arts colleges in Michigan
Education in Calhoun County, Michigan
Defunct private universities and colleges in Michigan
Educational institutions disestablished in 2016